3MT Venue, also known just as 3MT, is the Three Minute Theatre in Afflecks Arcade, Oldham Street, Manchester, England. It was a 70-seat independent theatre, cinema and music venue established in 2010 it closed in July 2019. Its first incarnation was on the third floor of the Afflecks building on 16 October 2010 inside the Ghosts in the Machine unit.
Its repertoire concentrated on new drama, poetry and comedy. It had a licensed bar. In 2012 it was the host of the first Afflecks Fringe Festival.

References

External links

 
 Twitter

Theatres in Greater Manchester